Huétor-Tájar (or Huétor Tájar) is a  municipality and town located in the province of Granada (Andalusia), in the southern Spain. It is situated 43 km west of the city of Granada, and its population in 2007 was 9,467. The municipality's extension is close to 40 km². Huétor-Tájar lies within the fertile Genil river valley, a part of the Granada depression.

The main source of income is the asparagus culture and its commercialisation under the Geographical Indication Esparragos de Huétor-Tájar.

The town is located near Granada, which has had a significant influence on it during the centuries.

External links
 Official site for Tourism of the province of Granada

Municipalities in the Province of Granada